Pat Ford (born 11 May 1931 in Orange, New South Wales) is an Australian professional light/welterweight boxer of the 1950s who won the Australian lightweight title, and British Empire lightweight title, his professional fighting weight varied from , i.e. lightweight to , i.e. welterweight. He was inducted into the Australian National Boxing Hall of Fame in 2006.

Professional boxing record
Career Record
	date  
opponent	
record

location	
result

		
26	1955-05-30

Lahouari Godih
31 3 2		Sydney Stadium, Sydney, New South Wales, Australia
L	DQ			
25	1955-05-02

Don McTaggart
39 7 4		Sydney Stadium, Sydney, New South Wales, Australia
W 	TKO			
24	1955-03-21

Lahouari Godih
29 3 2		Sydney Stadium, Sydney, New South Wales, Australia
L	PTS			
23	1954-07-02

Ivor Germain
31 16 2		West Melbourne Stadium, Melbourne, Victoria, Australia
W 	PTS			
	Commonwealth (British Empire) lightweight title

22	1954-04-09

Ivor Germain
30 15 2		West Melbourne Stadium, Melbourne, Victoria, Australia
L	PTS							
	Commonwealth (British Empire) lightweight title

21	1954-02-26

Agustin Argote
31 10 6		West Melbourne Stadium, Melbourne, Victoria, Australia
L	PTS							
20	1953-12-11

Agustin Argote
29 9 6		West Melbourne Stadium, Melbourne, Victoria, Australia
L	KO							
19	1953-11-13

Ivor Germain
29 13 2		West Melbourne Stadium, Melbourne, Victoria, Australia
W 	PTS							
18	1953-10-09

Frank Johnson
36 3 0		West Melbourne Stadium, Melbourne, Victoria, Australia
W 	KO							
	Commonwealth (British Empire) lightweight title

17	1953-08-28

Frank Johnson
36 2 0		West Melbourne Stadium, Melbourne, Victoria, Australia
W 	PTS							
	Commonwealth (British Empire) lightweight title

16	1953-07-24

Jackie Ryan
29 9 1		West Melbourne Stadium, Melbourne, Victoria, Australia
W 	TKO							
	Australian lightweight title

15	1953-05-08

Frank Flannery
33 17 9		West Melbourne Stadium, Melbourne, Victoria, Australia
W 	TKO			

			
	Australian lightweight title

14	1953-03-09

Joe McEntee
22 4 0		Sydney Stadium, Sydney, New South Wales, Australia
W 	TKO							
13	1953-02-13

Ray Fitton
30 14 8		West Melbourne Stadium, Melbourne, Victoria, Australia
W 	TKO							
12	1952-11-24

Ray French
14 0 4		Sydney Stadium, Sydney, New South Wales, Australia
W 	TKO							
11	1952-10-31

Eric Boon
97 21 5		Brisbane Stadium, Brisbane, Queensland, Australia
W 	TKO							
10	1952-10-03

Alfie Clay
15 9 3		Brisbane Stadium, Brisbane, Queensland, Australia
W 	TKO							
9	1952-09-12

Gordon Meredith
14 7 0		Brisbane Stadium, Brisbane, Queensland, Australia
W 	TKO							
8	1952-07-25

Dave Landers
35 22 3		Brisbane Stadium, Brisbane, Queensland, Australia
W 	TKO							
7	1952-06-23

Charlie Dunn
22 8 3		Sydney Stadium, Sydney, New South Wales, Australia
W 	TKO							
6	1952-06-13

Jackie Ryan
24 8 1		Brisbane Stadium, Brisbane, Queensland, Australia
W 	KO							
5	1951-12-03

Mickey Anelzark
36 8 4		Sydney Stadium, Sydney, New South Wales, Australia
W 	TKO							
4	1951-10-15

Teddy Dillon
13 5 0		Sydney Stadium, Sydney, New South Wales, Australia
W 	KO							
3	1951-07-02

Charlie Dunn
20 6 3		Dubbo, New South Wales, Australia
L	KO							
2	1951-07-02

Charlie Ward
11 11 1		Sydney Stadium, Sydney, New South Wales, Australia
W 	TKO							
1	1951-05-25

Gordon Meredith
7 2 0		Dubbo, New South Wales, Australia
W 	PTS

References

External links

Image - Pat Ford

1931 births
Lightweight boxers
Living people
People from the Central West (New South Wales)
Welterweight boxers
Australian male boxers
Commonwealth Boxing Council champions
Sportsmen from New South Wales